Shawn Mayne (born June 5, 1980) is a former Canadian football defensive end in the Canadian Football League. He was drafted by the Hamilton Tiger-Cats with the 18th overall pick in the 2006 CFL Draft. He played college football at UConn.

He was acquired by Montreal through a trade with the Winnipeg Blue Bombers. He was released by the Alouettes and re-signed with the Winnipeg Blue Bombers on February 15, 2011.

He is currently the head coach for the Champlain Saint-Lambert Cavaliers football team. His coaching career has also included the CCL Dynamiques, Vanier Cheetahs and the Concordia Stingers which are part of the CIS.

References

External links
Just Sports Stats
Winnipeg Blue Bombers bio

1980 births
Living people
Anglophone Quebec people
Canadian football defensive linemen
UConn Huskies football players
Hamilton Tiger-Cats players
Montreal Alouettes players
Players of Canadian football from Quebec
Canadian football people from Montreal
Winnipeg Blue Bombers players